Carlos Carús Suárez was a Mexican football forward who played for Mexico in the 1954 FIFA World Cup. He played most of his professional career for Toluca.

Career
Born in Veracruz, Carús started his professional career at the Mexican Segunda División with Atlético Veracruz in 1952. In 1953, he joined Toluca, the club had just earned his promotion to Primera División the previous season and was making its debut at the Mexican football top-level league. Carús played as a striker for Toluca from 1953 until 1962, when he retired and went back to his hometown.

Carús was part of the squad that represented Mexico in the 1954 FIFA World Cup, but he did not play any match.

Carús scored Toluca's first goal in Primera División on 9 August 1953, in the team's 2–1 victory against Atlante.

Carús died in 1997.

Style of play
Carús was once defined as a player "with a lot of goal vision and agility to shoot, being a constant threat to the opponent's goal, because of his ability to shoot with both legs, to lose the mark and to dribble."

Career statistics

References

External links
FIFA profile

Mexico international footballers
Association football forwards
Footballers from Veracruz
People from Veracruz (city)
Deportivo Toluca F.C. players
1954 FIFA World Cup players
1930 births
Mexican footballers
Liga MX players
1997 deaths